Sankaramanallur is a panchayat town in Tirupur district in the Indian state of Tamil Nadu.

Demographics
 India census, Sankaramanallur had a population of 9541. Males constitute 50% of the population and females 50%. Sankaramanallur has an average literacy rate of 58%, lower than the national average of 59.5%: male literacy is 68%, and female literacy is 47%. In Sankaramanallur, 11% of the population is under 6 years of age.

References

Cities and towns in Tiruppur district